Lakeville South High School (LSHS) is a high school located Lakeville, Minnesota, United States. To meet the needs of a growing population, in the early 2000s the district began construction of LSHS. LSHS enrolled students for the first time in fall 2005. Unlike LNHS, whose student come from a predominantly urban/suburban catchment area, LSHS pulls from the suburban/rural areas of Lakeville. This socioeconomic divide has contributed to the ferocity of the rivalry between LNHS and LSHS athletics. In addition, the close proximity and closeness of the community in the City of Lakeville also plays a large role in the strong community competition between the two high schools.

The school is a member of Minnesota Independent School District 194 (Lakeville Area Public Schools), and is affiliated with the Minnesota State High School League (MSHSL). The school is a member of the South Suburban Conference.

Athletics

The school competes under the Minnesota State High School League and is a member of the competitive South Suburban Conference. The school was in the Lake Conference until 2009–2010.

Notable alumni
Justin Kloos, professional ice hockey player
Mitch Leidner, former quarterback for the Minnesota Golden Gophers

References

External links

 

Public high schools in Minnesota
Educational institutions established in 2005
Schools in Dakota County, Minnesota
2005 establishments in Minnesota